È arrivata la felicità is an Italian television comedy-drama series created by Stefano Bises, Ivan Cotroneo, Monica Rametta; and produced by Publispei and Rai Fiction. The setting of the show are Aventino and Testaccio, two districts in Rome.

Synopses

Cast and characters

Main
 Claudio Santamaria as Orlando Mieli
 Claudia Pandolfi as Angelica Camilli 
 Giulia Bevilacqua as Valeria Camili – sister of Angelica and partner of Rita Nardelli

Recurring

Development

Season 1 (2015)

Season 2 (2018)

Reception

Awards and nominations

Episodes

Season 1 (2015)

Season 2 (2018)

Ratings

Italy

Foreign countries

References

External links
 
  E' arrivata la felicità at RaiPlay

2015 Italian television series debuts
2010s Italian drama television series
Italian-language television shows
Italian television series
Lesbian-related television shows
RAI original programming